Jay Miller (born July 16, 1960) is an American former ice hockey player. He played for the Boston Bruins and Los Angeles Kings of the National Hockey League (NHL) between 1985 and 1992.

Early life
Raised in Natick, Massachusetts, Miller played college hockey with the New Hampshire Wildcats.

Career 
Miller was selected by the Quebec Nordiques in the fourth round, 66th overall in the 1980 NHL Entry Draft. Miller never got a chance to show his skills with the Nordiques however, spending a few seasons with a handful of minor league teams. In 1985, the 6'2 left winger signed as a free agent with the Boston Bruins and made the team that year as their enforcer. In the 1985–86 season he played in 46 games and collected 178 penalty minutes. During his stint with the Boston Bruins, Miller was known for his many fights with John Kordic.

His role continued to expand with the Boston Bruins, playing in 78 games during the 1987-88 regular season and racking up 304 penalty minutes - both career highs. That year in the playoffs, Miller was a regular on the Bruins' squad playing in 12 games and picking up 124 minutes in penalties. In January 1989 he was traded from Boston Bruins to the Los Angeles Kings for future considerations. Miller played four more seasons with the Kings, in the role of enforcer on a team that included Wayne Gretzky. He retired from professional hockey in 1992, having played 446 career NHL regular season games with 1723 penalty minutes.

Personal life
Miller had a son in 1991, also named Jay, who played football at Worcester Polytechnic Institute. Jay Sr. has a daughter named Brooke who played college hockey on defense for the Holy Cross Crusaders. His youngest daughter, Taylor, played basketball as a forward for Saint Michael's College in Burlington, Vermont.

Miller and his wife Paula Miller (née Perini) operate the Courtyard Restaurant & Pub in Bourne, Massachusetts.

Career statistics

Regular season and playoffs

External links 
 

1960 births
Living people
American men's ice hockey left wingers
Boston Bruins players
Fredericton Express players
Ice hockey players from Massachusetts
Los Angeles Kings players
Maine Mariners players
Mohawk Valley Stars players
Moncton Golden Flames players
Muskegon Lumberjacks players
New Hampshire Wildcats men's ice hockey players
People from Natick, Massachusetts
People from Wellesley, Massachusetts
Quebec Nordiques draft picks
Sportspeople from Middlesex County, Massachusetts
Sportspeople from Norfolk County, Massachusetts
Toledo Goaldiggers players